Angelo Dominik Caloiaro (born July 28, 1989) is an American-Italian professional basketball player for Galatasaray Nef of the Basketbol Süper Ligi (BSL). He played college basketball for the University San Francisco before playing professionally in Bulgaria, Germany, Spain, Turkey and Israel.

Early life
Caloiaro attended Archbishop Mitty High School in San Jose, California, where he led the team to the 2008 State Division II title game. He ranked second on the team in scoring (16.8) and led the squad in rebounding (8.6). Caloiaro captured First Team honors from the San Jose Mercury News and earned all-West Catholic Athletic League second team honors after senior season.

College career
Caloiaro played college basketball for the University of San Francisco's Dons, and in his junior season averaged 7.3 rebounds per game (3rd in the WCC). He averaged 14.2 points (6th in the WCC), 5.9 rebounds, 2.3 assists and 1.5 steals (5th) per game as a senior in 2011–12. He was 3rd in the WCC with a .580 two-point field goal percentage, and 6th with a .793 free throw percentage. Caloiaro ranked fifth on USF career 3-pointer list with 131 and tied for third in the West Coast Conference with six double-double performances. On February 28, 2012, Caloiaro earned a spot in the First-team All-WCC.

Professional career

Rilski (2013)
On January 31, 2013, Caloiaro signed with the Bulgarian team Rilski Sportist for the rest of the season. On April 7, 2013, Caloiaro recorded a season-high 26 points, shooting 9-of-13 from the field, along with 12 rebounds in a 91–95 loss to Cherno More.

Mitteldeutscher BC (2013–2014)
On June 14, 2013, Caloiaro signed with the German team Mitteldeutscher BC for the 2013–14 season. On December 28, 2013, Caloiaro recorded a season-high 25 points, shooting 9-of-11 from the field, along with six rebounds and two assists in an 83–77 win over Medi Bayreuth. On January 18, 2014, Caloiaro participated in the 2014 BBL All-Star Game. On February 5, 2014, Caloiaro was named MVP of the Month for games played in January.

Caloiaro finished his first season in Germany as the 2014 BBL Regular Season fifth-leading rebounder with 6.8 per game and also averaged 12 points and 1.5 assists per game. On April 24, 2014, Caloiaro earned a spot in the  All-BBL First Team.

Telekom Bonn (2014–2015)

On July 25, 2014, Caloiaro signed a one-year deal with Telekom Baskets Bonn. On April 17, 2015, Caloiaro recorded a season-high 26 points, shooting 9-of-15 from the field, along with seven rebounds and two steals in a 78–71 win over Eisbaren Bremerhaven.

Caloiaro helped Bonn reach the 2015 BBL-Pokal Semifinals (German Cup) and the 2015 BBL Playoffs, where they eventually lost to ratiopharm Ulm.

Obradoiro (2015–2016)
On August 1, 2015, Caloiaro signed with the Spanish team Obradoiro CAB for the 2015–16 season. On March 6, 2016, Caloiaro recorded a season-high 23 points, shooting 9-of-13 from the field, along with six rebounds and two steals in an 81–64 win over Manresa.

Büyükçekmece (2016–2017)
On July 3, 2016, Caloiaro signed with the Turkish team Büyükçekmece for the 2016–17 season. On February 11, 2017, Caloiaro recorded a double-double with a season-high 23 points and 14 rebounds, shooting 8-of-15 from the field in 69–73 loss to Tofaş.

Caloiaro helped Büyükçekmece reach the 2017 FIBA Europe Cup Round of 16, where they eventually lost to Enisey.

Banvit (2017–2018)
On July 5, 2017, Caloiaro signed a one-year deal with Banvit. On May 28, 2018, Caloiaro recorded a career-high 29 points, shooting 10-of-12 from the field, along with 5 rebounds, 5 assists and 3 steals in 81–86 playoff loss to Fenerbahçe.

Caloiaro helped Banvit reach the 2018 Turkish League Semifinals, as well as reaching the 2018 FIBA Champions League Quarterfinals, where they eventually lost to Monaco. In 54 games played during the 2017–18 season (played in the Turkish League and the Champions League), Caloiaro averaged 12.4 points, 5.7 rebounds, 1.8 assists and 1.2 steals per game, shooting 43.8 percent from 3-point range.

Maccabi Tel Aviv (2018–2022)

On June 26, 2018, Caloiaro joined the Israeli team Maccabi Tel Aviv of the EuroLeague, signing a one-year deal. On January 24, 2019, Caloiaro recorded a double-double of 20 points and 11 rebounds, shooting 6-of-9 from the field in an 84–75 win over Panathinaikos. Two days later, Caloiaro was named EuroLeague Round 20 MVP. Caloiaro helped Maccabi win the Israeli League championship title.

On June 30, 2019, Caloiaro signed a one-year contract extension with Maccabi. He averaged 7.2 points and 5.3 rebounds per game during the 2020–21 season. On July 11, 2021, Caloiaro re-signed with the team.

Galatasaray Nef (2022–present)
On 15 July 2022, he has signed with Galatasaray Nef of the Turkish Basketbol Süper Ligi (BSL).

Personal life
Both of Caloiaro's parents played college basketball, his brother Vinny played professional soccer and sister Joan played high-level college volleyball. Then there are cousins who played for the U.S.A. national teams in soccer and rugby and another, Kerri Walsh Jennings, who won three Olympic gold medals in beach volleyball.

Career statistics

College

|-
| style="text-align:left;"| 2008–09
| style="text-align:left;"| San Francisco
| 30 || 13 || 25.4 || .411 || .274 || .689 || 3.9 || 1.3 || .6 || .2 || 6.0
|-
| style="text-align:left;"| 2009–10
| style="text-align:left;"| San Francisco
| 30 || 28 || 28.0 || .497 || .491 || .732 || 3.6 || 1.6 || .7 || .1 || 8.9
|-
| style="text-align:left;"| 2010–11
| style="text-align:left;"| San Francisco
| 34 || 34 || 33.4 || .395 || .327 || .787 || 7.2 || 1.8 || .7 || .2 || 9.9
|-
| style="text-align:left;"| 2011–12
| style="text-align:left;"| San Francisco
| 34 || 34 || 30.9 || .486 || .382 || .795 || 5.9 || 2.3 || 1.7 || .2 || 14.0
|-class="sortbottom"
| colspan=2 style="text-align:center;"| Career
| 128 || 109 || 29.6 || .448 || .372 || .770 || 5.3 || 1.8 || .9 || .2 || 9.8

EuroLeague

|-
| style="text-align:left;"| 2018–19
| style="text-align:left;"| Maccabi
| 30 || 27 || 24.7 || .478 || .315 || .792 || 4.8 || 1.4 || 1.2 || .1 || 7.4 || 10.2
|-
| style="text-align:left;"| 2019–20
| style="text-align:left;"| Maccabi
| 18 || 10 || 21.0 || .456 || .344 || .818 || 2.8 || 1.4 || 0.7 || .0 || 5.6 || 
|-
| style="text-align:left;"| 2020–21
| style="text-align:left;"| Maccabi
| 33 || 27 || 25.6 || .464 || .317 || .818 || 3.4 || 1.7 || 0.9 || .1 || 5.9 || 
|-
| style="text-align:left;"| 2021–22
| style="text-align:left;"| Maccabi
| 35 || 18 || 19.8 || .435 || .325 || .913 || 3.1 || 1.3 || 0.6 || .0 || 3.3 || 
|-
|- class="sortbottom"
| style="text-align:center;" colspan="2"| Career
| 116 || 82 || ||  ||  || ||  ||  ||  ||  ||  ||

Domestic Leagues

|-
| style="text-align:center;" rowspan=1| 2013
| style="text-align:left;" rowspan=1| Rilski
| style="text-align:center;" rowspan=1| NBL
| 21 || 29.1 || .522 || .359 || .792 || 7.3 || 2.5 || 1.6 || .0 || 13.2
|-
| style="text-align:center;" rowspan=1| 2013–14
| style="text-align:left;" rowspan=1| Mitteldeutscher BC
| style="text-align:center;" rowspan=2| BBL
| 34 || 31.3 || .488 || .345 || .767 || 6.8 || 2.2 || 1.0 || .2 || 14.3
|-
| style="text-align:center;" rowspan=1| 2014–15
| style="text-align:left;" rowspan=1| Telekom Bonn
| 39 || 26.6 || .502 || .372 || .751 || 4.2 || 1.5 || 1.2 || .1 || 12.0
|-
| style="text-align:center;" rowspan=1| 2015–16
| style="text-align:left;" rowspan=1| Obradoiro
| style="text-align:center;" rowspan=1| ACB
| 34 || 30.2 || .524 || .330 || .743 || 5.6 || 1.2 || 2.0 || .2 || 11.5
|-
| style="text-align:center;" rowspan=1| 2016–17
| style="text-align:left;" rowspan=1| Büyükçekmece
| style="text-align:center;" rowspan=2| BSL
| 30 || 29.5 || .581 || .413 || .723 || 6.5 || 1.6 || 1.0 || .3 || 11.9
|-
| style="text-align:center;" rowspan=1| 2017–18
| style="text-align:left;" rowspan=1| Banvit
| 35 || 31.2 || .585 || .458 || .827 || 5.9 || 1.8 || 1.2 || .1 || 13.1
|-
| style="text-align:center;" rowspan=1| 2018–19
| style="text-align:left;" rowspan=1| Maccabi
| style="text-align:center;" rowspan=1| IPL
| 33 || 16.5 || .491 || .371 || .778 || 3.5 || 1.3 || .7 || .0 || 5.2
|-
|}
Source: RealGM

References

External links
San Francisco Dons bio
RealGM Profile
Eurobasket.com Profile
Spanish ACB League Profile 
German BBL League Profile 
TBLStat.net Profile

1989 births
Living people
American expatriate basketball people in Bulgaria
American expatriate basketball people in Germany
American expatriate basketball people in Israel
American expatriate basketball people in Spain
American expatriate basketball people in Turkey
American men's basketball players
Bandırma B.İ.K. players
Basketball players from San Jose, California
BC Rilski Sportist players
Büyükçekmece Basketbol players
Italian men's basketball players
Liga ACB players
Maccabi Tel Aviv B.C. players
Mitteldeutscher BC players
Obradoiro CAB players
Power forwards (basketball)
San Francisco Dons men's basketball players
Small forwards
Telekom Baskets Bonn players
Galatasaray S.K. (men's basketball) players